Veliki Brat VIP 1, is the celebrity version of Veliki Brat. The show premiered on May 5, 2007. It was aired on three television channels: B92 in Serbia, Pink BH in Bosnia-Herzegovina, and Pink M in Montenegro.

Celebrities from Serbia, Bosnia and Herzegovina and Montenegro are competing for €50,000. The hosts of the show were Ana Mihajlovski and Irina Vukotić. The show lasted one month.

Housemates
Twelve housemates entered the show on Day 1. On Day 7, Aleksandar entered the house.

Nomination table

Tasks
Day 1 - VIP VeBevizija
Because 2007 Eurovision Song Contest is soon, Big Brother decided to make something like a Eurovision Song Contest where the housemates will compete with songs that represented Yugoslavia, Serbia and Montenegro and Bosnia and Herzegovina on ESC in the past. In three days the housemates will have to prepare their songs and also the choreography that will be performed on the stage.

The competitors are:

 "Brazil" (song that was originally performed by Bebi Dol for Yugoslavia) - Olja Karleuša and Ognjen Ivanović
 "In The Disco" (song was originally performed by Deen for Bosnia-Herzegovina) - Danijel Alibabić, Gordana Sekulić and Emina Hamzabegović
 "Zauvijek Moja" (song was originally performed by No Name for Serbia and Montenegro) - Saša Ćurčić and Pedja D'Boy
 "Ludi letnji ples" (song was originally performed by Flamingosi) - Dragan Marinković, Zorica Jocić Šuica, Big Lale and Marta Keler

Danijela Vranješ was the host. During this task Emina and Gordana had a fight. The housemates passed this task.

Day 2 - I'm known for...
In this task the housemateshad to perform something that they are known for. The housemates passed this task.

Day 5 - Boulevard of stars
In this task the housemates had to leave a print of the part of their body that they are most proud of in wet cement. And then they will have to hold a speech where they will thank everyone who helped them to become stars. The housemates passed this task.

Day 8 - I go to school
In this task the housemates once again went through second grade of primary school. Every day they had 4 classes. During this task they had to do things that little kids do (play games, wear school uniforms and they can't swear). The housemates passed this task.

Day 9 - Paparazzi

This task was a secret task. Aleksandar Jovanović had to take pictures of housemates and write articles about them, but the housemates can't find out what he's doing. He had 24 hours to do this task. Aleksandar didn't pass this task and he was nominated for eviction.

Day 12 - Tennis against Big Brother

The housemates played tennis against Big Brother. In the yard they had a tennis net and on the other side of the net machines that throw out tennis balls. The housemates played in pairs. The housemates get a point if they hit the tennis ball. The housemates passed this task and as reward they had a party next night.

Day 15 - VB Skandik Bank

In this task two housemates are the chefs of VB Skandik Bank, and all the other housemates are employees in the bank. The housemates will have 3 parts of this task and Big Brother told the chefs (Saša Ćurčić and Olja Karleuša) that they will pass this task if the employees of the bank pass 2 of those three parts of the task. The chefs also had a secret room in the house of Big Brother that was treated as their office (other housemates mustn't find out about the secret room or the task will be unsuccessful). But, that task was the fake one. Only the employees knew the real task, and the real task was not to pass 2 out of 3 parts of the task.

The first part of the task was to count money correctly. The employees tried really hard to sabotage this part, and they succeeded at that. The second part was to build a copy of the small building of Skandik bank. The employees again sabotaged the task. The third part was to invest money in some stocks. This time the employees didn't sabotage the task. By not passing 2 out of 3 parts of the task, the housemates passed the real task.

Day 20 - Sculptors
In this task Big Brother divided the housemates into 5 teams each consisting of two members. The task was to build a figure of their team mate out of clay. If they pass this task the housemates will as a reward get a party. The housemates passed this task.

External links 
 Production website (English)

2007 Serbian television seasons
01
Bosnia and Herzegovina television series

sr:Велики Брат у Србији